Clinton AME Zion Church is a historic African Methodist Episcopal church located on Johnson Street between Marion and Richland Streets in Kershaw, Lancaster County, South Carolina. It was built in 1909, and is a one-story, T-shaped, Gothic Revival style frame structure covered with clapboard siding and has a brick pier foundation with concrete block infill.  It was the first separate black church established in Kershaw in the early 20th century.

It was added to the National Register of Historic Places in 1990.

References

African-American history of South Carolina
Methodist churches in South Carolina
Churches on the National Register of Historic Places in South Carolina
Carpenter Gothic church buildings in South Carolina
Churches completed in 1909
20th-century Methodist church buildings in the United States
Churches in Lancaster County, South Carolina
National Register of Historic Places in Lancaster County, South Carolina